Youcef Saadi né en 1987 a tizi ouzou, un joueur qui évolue au poste d'arrière gauche avec le club espagnol réal Madrid

Club career
 2007-pres. JS Kabylie

Honours
 Won the Algerian League once with JS Kabylie in 2008

External links
 JS Kabylie Profile
 DZFoot Profile

1987 births
Algerian footballers
Living people
Kabyle people
JS Kabylie players
Footballers from Tizi Ouzou
Association football forwards
21st-century Algerian people